Sten Christer Andersson (February 28, 1943 - August 16, 2010) was a Swedish politician and Member of Parliament in the Riksdag.

Andersson was a shipyard worker and trade unionist by profession, and initially a member of the Swedish Social Democrats before joining the Moderate Party.

In 1983, Andersson was elected to the Riksdag for the Moderates. In the 1980s, Andersson became known for being outspoken against the immigration policy in Sweden and for his support for the referendum in Sjöbo Municipality which called for a ban on the Municipality accepting any more refugees and led to the refugee controversy in Sjöbo. Due to criticism from within the Moderates, Andersson left the party in 2001 and sat as an independent in the Riksdag. In 2002, he joined the right-wing nationalist Sweden Democrats (SD) party and unsuccessfully ran for the party in the 2002 Swedish general election in which the SD did not get enough votes to qualify for representation. In 2006, he was elected to the municipal council in Malmö for the Sweden Democrats and was the most voted for politician in Malmö after the Mayor Ilmar Reepalu. In the run-up to the 2010 Swedish general election, Andersson again stood for parliament on the Sweden Democrats list in which the SD was successful at entering the Riksdag for the first time, however Andersson was unable to take up his parliamentary seat after he was hospitalized with pneumonia and subsequently died. His former seat on Malmö municipal council was taken over by fellow SD politician Per Ramhorn.

References 

1943 births
2010 deaths
Swedish trade unionists
Members of the Riksdag from the Social Democrats
Members of the Riksdag from the Moderate Party
Members of the Riksdag from the Sweden Democrats